The 2019 NFL Honors was an awards presentation by the National Football League that honored its best players from the 2018 NFL season. It was held on February 2, 2019 at the Fox Theatre in Atlanta, Georgia and pre–recorded for same–day broadcast on CBS in the United States at 9:00 PM/8:00 PM CT. Five finalists went to the Pro Football Hall of Fame in Canton, Ohio. Steve Harvey hosted the ceremony.

List of award winners

References

NFL Honors 008
2018 National Football League season
2019 in American football
2019 in sports in Georgia (U.S. state)
2010s in Georgia (U.S. state)